Swami Chakrapani is an Indian political activist. He is the leader of a breakaway faction of the Hindu Mahasabha, a long-standing Hindu nationalist organisation in India, but claims to be its overall president. He has gained media attention for his purchase of wanted criminal Dawood Ibrahim's properties at auctions to later vandalize them. Later he join as contestant in alt balaji lock upp.

In March 2018, Chakrapani was designated as a fraudulent ascetic by Akhil Bharatiya Akhara Parishad, the apex organisation of Hindu sants (saints) and sadhus (ascetics) in India.

Activism 
Chakrapani has claimed to be the president of the Akhil Bharatiya Hindu Mahasabha (ABHM), advocating for the listing of ABHM as a political entity. The Election Commission of India refused to recognise the organisation due to ongoing rivalries with another faction that wants to be designated as the actual office-bearers of ABHM.

The car was in a poor state and on 24 December, Chakrapani burnt the car along with posters of Ibrahim as a symbolic protest. Chakrapani initially wished to turn the car into an ambulance but withdrew after receiving threats from D-Company; he spoke about using the wreckage in the construction of a toilet. Chakrapani was soon allotted Z category security by the Government of India, due to threats from D-company; four people were arrested for plotting to kill Chakrapani. Chakrapani has since bid for other properties belonging to Dawood, including an eatery and hotel, intending to convert them into public toilets.

Chakrapani was one of the litigants in the Ram Janmabhoomi case and has proposed building a gold Ram temple in Ayodhya, which will have priests from the scheduled castes and scheduled tribes.

During the 2018 Kerala floods, Chakrapani publicly opposed providing help to beef eaters and blamed the floods on the killing of cows. Following his statement, the official website of the Hindu Mahasabha was hacked and defaced with a recipe for spicy beef curry.

In March 2018, the Akhil Bharatiya Akhara Parishad declared Chakrapani to be a "fake baba", saying he does not belong to any tradition of sanyasa. In response, Chakrapani said the Parishad were false saints and "a bogus body".

He has also promoted gomutra (cow urine) as a cure for ailments including COVID-19. In 2022, he participated in the Indian reality show Lock Upp but was the first to be eliminated.

Television

References 

Living people
Year of birth missing (living people)
Place of birth missing (living people)
Hindu nationalists
21st-century Indian politicians
Hindu Mahasabha politicians
COVID-19 pandemic in India
Ayodhya dispute